"Summer Night City" is a song recorded by the Swedish pop group ABBA, written by Benny Andersson and Björn Ulvaeus as a tribute to their hometown of Stockholm. It is the group's second non-album single, released on 6 September 1978. It was recorded during the sessions of the group's upcoming Voulez-Vous album, but was eventually not included. However, it was included on the ABBA compilation album Greatest Hits Vol. 2 in October 1979, more than a year after its release. It was also featured as a bonus track on both the 1997 and 2001 CD re-issues of Voulez-Vous and as the full length version with the original intro on the 2010 re-issue.

History
The recording sessions for "Summer Night City" began in early 1978. It had the working titles of "Kalle Sändare" and "Dancing in the Moonlight". ABBA's new recording studio, Polar Music Studio, had opened in May 1978, but had not been ready to use initially, so the primary backing track had been recorded at Metronome Studio. A 43-second ballad-style introduction to the song had been edited out to improve the overall quality, but nothing seemed to work. Allegedly, mixing the single took at least a week, far more than it took to mix any other track in ABBA's recording history. They felt something was wrong with the recording but couldn't put their finger on it. In the end, the song had an enormous amount of compression applied to it to give it a more "driving" sound. Agnetha has been quoted as saying she didn't like the song to start with, as she felt "it wasn't ABBA" but later on grew to like it. A reluctant ABBA decided to release "Summer Night City" as a single in September despite their disappointment with the track in its current form. The group still performed the song live on their 1979 world tour, though with the original introduction that had been removed from the studio recording. The previously unreleased version with the extended introduction was finally released as part of the box set Thank You for the Music in 1994.

Their ambivalence about the record has surfaced occasionally in interviews where Benny has said "we shouldn't have released that one", and Bjorn called the recording "really lousy".

B-side: Medley  
The single's B-side was a medley of the American traditional songs "Pick a Bale of Cotton", "On Top of Old Smokey", and "Midnight Special", which the group had recorded in May 1975. This was the only song released by ABBA that was not written by any of the members themselves. On the single, "Medley" was actually a re-equalised version of the original 1975 version that had been issued on the German charity album Stars im Zeichen eines guten Sterns (Polydor). However, the 1978 compressed version is very similar, so much so that a mistake was made in the booklet notes of the 1994 4-CD boxed set Thank You for the Music. It turned out that the 1975 original version was included in that set but it was claimed to be the 1978 compressed. The "Medley" mystery was allegedly solved when the UK single master tapes were returned by Epic Records to Polar Music in Sweden in the early 2000s. As the UK tapes had definitely included the 1978 compressed version, it then became possible to determine which version was which. As explained by ABBA historian Carl Magnus Palm:

Reception
Despite the group's negative views of the song, "Summer Night City" was another sizeable hit for ABBA, albeit not one of their biggest. It topped the charts in Ireland, Finland and Sweden; the group's last No. 1 in their home country for 43 years until September 2021 when ABBA's comeback single "Don't Shut Me Down" reached the top spot. It also reached the Top 5 in Belgium, the Netherlands, Norway, Rhodesia and Switzerland. In the UK, "Summer Night City" reached No. 7 in the charts and then dropped, which was ABBA's lowest peak position for three and a half years. This caused concern for the group given that it was their first release after a seven-month break; the single however reached a new peak of No. 5 the following week. Nevertheless, it remained ABBA's lowest-charting single in the UK for the period 1976–1980.

As of September 2021, it is ABBA's 18th-biggest song in the UK, including both pure sales and digital streams.

"Summer Night City" makes small appearances in the musical Mamma Mia!. Samples from the song appear in scrambled "nightmare" form during the entr'acte, and is also scene change music between the songs "The Winner Takes It All" and "Take a Chance on Me".

Charts

Weekly charts

Year-end charts

Cover versions
Various eurotrance cover remixes by Abbacadabra were released through Almighty Records during the 1990s. The song was most recently included on the 2008 compilation We Love ABBA: The Mamma Mia Dance Collection. Audio samples can be heard on the official Almighty Records website.
In 2001, the digipack edition of Swedish Symphonic metal band Therion's Secret of the Runes album contained their cover of this song. There is also a live version on their Live in Midgård album. They also produced a music video for the studio version of the cover.
In 2004, Swedish musician Nils Landgren covered the song on his album Funky ABBA from 2004.
In 2005, Israeli DJ Offer Nissim recorded a dance cover of "Summer Night City" on his album First Time. This version omits some of the original lyrics of the song and features singer Maya Simantov on vocals.
Dance versions of the song have been recorded by Angeleyes on their 1999 ABBAdance album, Jill Dreski, Astaire, Australian singer Donna Burke on the 2001 Japanese ABBA Ibiza Caliente Mix compilation, and DJ Ensamble on the 2006 album Trancing Queen.
In 2009, Russian singer Roma Kenga released an English language eurotrance cover of the song.
In 2019, British duo, Bananarama performed "Summer Night City" live during their An Evening with Bananarama Q&A tour to launch their 11th studio album In Stereo. "Summer Night City," however, doesn't appear on the album.

References

1978 singles
ABBA songs
Number-one singles in Sweden
European Hot 100 Singles number-one singles
Irish Singles Chart number-one singles
Polar Music singles
Songs written by Benny Andersson and Björn Ulvaeus
Music videos directed by Lasse Hallström
1978 songs
Songs about Stockholm
Songs about nights